The IPSC Australasia Tournament Championship is an IPSC level 4 Tournament championship hosted in Australasia.

Champions 
The following is a list of current and past IPSC Australasian Tournament Champions.

Overall category

Lady category

Junior category

Senior category

Super Senior category

References

IPSC :: Match Results - 2009 Australasia 3-Gun Championship, Philippines

IPSC shooting competitions
Oceanian international sports competitions
Shooting sports in Asia
Shooting sports in Oceania